"Shizuku" (雫, literally "droplet") is a song by Japanese electronicore band Esprit D'Air, originally released on June 29, 2012, as a single. It was later re-recorded and re-released on February 10, 2023, in collaboration with Australian producer, Misstiq and new vocals from Kai.

Shizuku is one of Esprit D'Air's oldest song. The song was producer Kai's first song he had ever produced with the original singer Yoshisuke Suga.

Chart performance
The single entered the Official Charts, peaking at #4 in the Physical Singles Chart, #47 in the Single Downloads Chart, and #37 in the Single Sales Chart.

Use in video games
"Shizuku" appears in the Harmonix's Rock Band video game series. It was first available on Rock Band 3 for Xbox 360 as the first playable song in the 'J-Rock' genre tag of the game in 2013. It was later re-released onto Rock Band 4 for both Xbox One and PlayStation 4 in 2023, still as the only song in the 'J-Rock' genre tag.

Track listing

Original 2012 version

Re-recorded 2023 version

Charts

References

2012 songs
2012 singles
2023 singles
Esprit D'Air songs